This article presents a list of the historical events and publications of Australian literature during 1876.

Books 

 Rolf Boldrewood — A Colonial Reformer
 Ada Cambridge — My Guardian : A Story of the Fen Country
 Maud Jean Franc — Two Sides to Every Question
 James Brunton Stephens — A Hundred Pounds

Poetry 

 Robert Dudley Adams — "Trucanini's Dirge"
 Ernest Favenc — "Dead in the Queensland Bush"
 Henry Kendall
 "Bill the Bullock Driver"
 "Kingsborough"
 James Brunton Stephens — Mute Discourse : A Poem

Births 

 6 February — Alice Guerin Crist, poet, author and journalist (died 1941)
 20 March — Winifred Lewellin James, novelist (died 1941)
 2 September — Will Lawson, poet and novelist (died 1957)
 7 September — C. J. Dennis, poet (died 1938)
 4 October — Hugh McCrae, poet (died 1958)
 5 October — John Bede Dalley, journalist and novelist (died 1935)
 30 December — Archibald Strong, poet (died 1930)

Deaths 

 24 May — Henry Kingsley, novelist (born 1830)

See also 
 1876 in poetry
 List of years in literature
 List of years in Australian literature
 1876 in literature
 1875 in Australian literature
 1876 in Australia
 1877 in Australian literature

References

Literature
Australian literature by year
19th-century Australian literature
1876 in literature